FFS2 can refer to 

FFS2, Flash File System 2, developed and patented by Microsoft.
FFS2, Unix File System, Berkeley Fast File System, the BSD Fast File System or FFS
FFS2, Amiga Fast File System